Moriches Bay is a lagoon system on the south shore of Long Island, New York. The name Moriches comes from Meritces, a Native American who owned land on Moriches Neck.

Two townships in Suffolk, New York (Brookhaven and the Southampton) share its shoreline.

Moriches Bay is east of the Mastic Narrows and Great South Bay and west of Shinnecock Bay.

This includes Moneybogue Bay and Quantuck Bay, its salt marshes, dredged material islands, and intertidal flats.

This body of water is between the Outer barrier islands and Long Island mainland. Its flow comes from the Moriches and Shinnecock Inlets)

The western boundary of this bay is the Smith Point Bridge; the eastern boundary is the eastern edge of Quantuck Bay.
This bayside habitat includes the tidal creeks and marshes feeding into Moriches Bay from the Long Island mainland.

A thriving habitat off the Atlantic Ocean, the Moriches Bay is used by Long Islanders for local fishing.
It is a natural habitat for shellfish,  migrating and wintering waterfowl, colonial nesting waterbirds, beach-nesting birds, migratory shorebirds, raptors, and rare plants.

The Great South Bay and Moriches Bay seabeds up to the barrier beach are owned by the towns through a grant by the British monarch long before the existence of the United States. It has been repeatedly adjudicated (even to the U.S. Supreme Court) that the land grants in the Dongan (Governor of New York) patents (Islip, Brookhaven, Southampton and East Hampton Towns, 1686) are valid. However, since 1968 the federal government has been attempting to take title of and lay claim to, by adverse possession, the bay bottoms of Islip and Brookhaven towns extending outward from the barrier beach.

See also
Outer Barrier
Moriches Inlet
Patchogue Bay
Suffolk NY
South Shore Estuary

References

Brookhaven, New York
Lagoons of New York (state)
Southampton (town), New York
Bays of Suffolk County, New York